Ajai P Mangattu is a writer in Malayalam, from Kerala, India. He is a novelist, literary critic and journalist.  He lives in Kochi with his wife Manju, daughter Vajra and son Ameya. He was born in 1972 in a small mountainous village in Idukki district Kerala. His parental home is situated at Vellathooval, close to Munnar. it was a farming community, migrated from lower lands. His father Pakhrudheen, who was a newspaper agent for three decades, had run a bakery at Vellathooval and Ajai's mother Meera worked at home. He was the eldest of three children. The other two a brother and sister both now settled at Adimali, a town near to Vellathooval. He completed his school education at Vellathooval GHS (now GHSS) and after the SSC, went to Moolamattom St Joseph's College where he completed his Pre degree.

Career

He studied B A at Mar Athanasius College, Kothamangalam and M A in English language and Literature at Maharaja's College, Ernakulam later took a PG Diploma in Journalism and Communication from Kerala Media Academy In 1998, Ajai joined Malayala Manorama as a Sub editor trainee. Presently he is Assistant Editor with the same media house. Ajai has been writing literary prose and critical studies in major journals and magazines in Malayalam for the last 25 years and he has published books on various subjects. He wrote a biography on Noam Chomsky, his first published book, his first collection essays followed. He translated Gail Omvedt 's book on the life of Ambedkar into Malayalam and Derrida's Islam and West. He co translated Elif Shafak's novel Forty Rules of love, which is forthcoming His first novel Susannayude Grandhapura published in 2019 and sold 15  editions in less than 9 months.

Literary Works
Susannah's house of books – novel
It 's not the End of the World - literary essays 
The freedom of Birds- essays
A Chronicle of Solitude- a biography of Gabriel Garcia Marquez 
Noam Chomsky: An Intellectual
Biography B R Ambedkar: Towards an Enlightened India-Gail
Omvedt - Translation Night by Elie Wiesel - Translation Islam and West by Derrida - translation

References

 എത്ര പുസ്തകം ഓർമയിലുണ്ട് !
 അത്രയ്ക്കും സൗന്ദര്യമുള്ള ഒരു ലോകമാണീ കൃതിയിലുള്ളത്
 വായന ഉപേക്ഷിക്കാന്‍ തയ്യാറെന്ന് അജയ് പി മങ്ങാട്ട് ! ആരും വായിക്കാത്ത നോവലിനെ സോഷ്യല്‍ മീഡിയ ചര്‍ച്ചയാക്കി!
 വിവാഹമെന്ന വിഷം കുടിച്ചവന്റെ കഥ | Life Glint | The Clarity Portal
 അജയ് പി മങ്ങാട്ട് അഭിമുഖം: വായനക്കാരുടെ ഇന്റിലിജൻസിൽ ഞാൻ വിശ്വസിക്കുന്നു
 Ajai P Mangattu- Speaker in Kerala literature Festival KLF –2020| Keralaliteraturefestival.com
 Ajai P Mangattu, Author at Indian Express Malayalam
 സൂസന്നയുടെ ഗ്രന്ഥപ്പുര – My View Forum
 ചരിത്ര സന്ധിയിലെ കലാപകാലുഷ്യങ്ങള്‍; 'പൊറ്റാളിലെ ഇടവഴിക'ളെക്കുറിച്ച് അജയ് പി മങ്ങാട്ടിന്റെ കുറിപ്പ്‌
 Kerala State Central Library catalog › Details for: Lokam avasanikkunnilla /
 Within 3 months of publishing, 10th edition of ‘Soosannayude Grandhappura’ to be out
 പുതിയ രണ്ടു നോവലിസ്റ്റുകൾ സ്വന്തമാക്കിയ 2019
 പൊട്ടുതൊടാത്ത സൂസന്നയുടെ നിഗൂഢതകള്‍ അലിയ്ക്കറിയാമായിരുന്നോ?

Living people
Writers from Kochi
Malayalam-language writers
Malayalam short story writers
Malayalam novelists
Maharaja's College, Ernakulam alumni
1972 births
Indian male novelists
21st-century Indian novelists
Indian male short story writers
Novelists from Kerala
20th-century Indian male writers
21st-century Indian male writers